Darcee Garbin (born 24 June 1994) is an Australian professional basketball player for DVTK-Hun-Therm of the Hungarian League.

Early life and family
Garbin is originally from Western Australia. Born in Kalgoorlie, she was raised in Kambalda before moving to Perth with her family. Garbin's younger sister, Sophie Garbin, is an Australia Fast5 netball international.

Playing career

WNBL
Garbin made her professional debut with the Australian Institute of Sport during the 2011–12 season. She then returned to her home state and joined the West Coast Waves, where she played three seasons. In 2015, she moved to Queensland to play for the Townsville Fire. She played five seasons for the Fire and won two championships. For the 2020–21 season, she returned to the WA franchise, now known as the Perth Lynx. She was named captain of the Lynx for the 2021–22 season.

SBL and QBL
Garbin made her debut in the State Basketball League (SBL) for the Rockingham Flames in 2011. She played for Rockingham every year until 2016, winning championships in 2014 and 2015. In 2017, she played for the Townsville Flames in the Queensland Basketball League (QBL). In 2018, she split the year with Rockingham and Townsville. In 2019, she won her third championship with Rockingham.

Germany and Hungary
In February 2019, Garbin moved to Germany to play out the 2018–19 season with Herner TC of the DBBL, where she won the DBBL Cup and the league championship.

In June 2022, Garbin signed with DVTK-Hun-Therm of the Hungarian League.

National team

Youth level
Garbin made her national team debut at the 2010 FIBA Oceania Youth Tournament in New Caledonia where Australia took home Gold. She would then go on to represent the Gems at the 2012 FIBA Oceania Under-18 Championship, where she helped take home the Gold and secure a place at the Under-19 World Championship the following year. At the 2013 FIBA Under-19 World Championship in Lithuania, Garbin was a starting five team member. The Gems would go on to take home the bronze after a win over Spain.

In 2017, Garbin was picked to play for the Australian university women's team, the Emerging Opals. She posted 26 points and 10 rebounds en route to an 85–74 victory over Japan A night earlier, Garbin posted eight points and four rebounds against Team USA as Australia suffered a 63–78 loss.

Senior level
In January 2019, Garbin was named to her first Opals squad, earning her a place in the first camp as preparations for this years upcoming tournaments got underway. After taking part in the Opals team camps, Garbin was named to the final roster for the 2019 FIBA Asia Cup where she would make her Opals debut.

References

External links 

 Darcee Garbin: WNBL
 WNBL stats
 SBL stats

1994 births
Living people
Australian Institute of Sport basketball (WNBL) players
Australian women's basketball players
Forwards (basketball)
Basketball players from Perth, Western Australia
Townsville Fire players
Universiade medalists in basketball
Universiade gold medalists for Australia
Perth Lynx players
Sportswomen from Western Australia
Medalists at the 2017 Summer Universiade
People from Kalgoorlie